Tinsel is a 1918 silent film drama directed by Oscar Apfel and featuring Kitty Gordon. It was produced and distributed by World Film Company.

Cast
Kitty Gordon - Princess Sylvia Carzoni
Muriel Ostriche - Ruth Carmichael
Frank Mayo - Jefferson Kane
Bradley Barker - Richard Carmichael
Ralph Graves - Bobby Woodward
George De Carlton - Stephen Roche
Tony Merlo - Dickey Flemming
Marie Nau - Denise
Anne Dearing - ?unknown role

Preservation status
Gordon's only surviving film. Prints are held at George Eastman House and the Library of Congress.

References

External links

1918 films
American silent feature films
American black-and-white films
Films directed by Oscar Apfel
Silent American drama films
1918 drama films
World Film Company films
1910s American films